Mary Dillon may refer to:

Mary Dillon (businesswoman) (born 1961/62), American businesswoman
Mary Dillon (singer) (born 1965), Northern Irish singer
Mary E. Dillon (1886–1983), American businesswoman